Vardanjan Rural District is in the Central District of Ben County, Chaharmahal and Bakhtiari province, Iran. At the census of 2006, its population was 11,014 in 2,668 households, when it was in Ben District of Shahrekord County before the establishment of Ben County. There were 8,549 inhabitants in 2,365 households at the following census of 2011. At the most recent census of 2016, the population of the rural district was 3,003 in 931 households, by which time it was in the Central District of Ben County. The largest of its four villages was Bardeh, with 2,356 people.

References 

Ben County

Rural Districts of Chaharmahal and Bakhtiari Province

Populated places in Chaharmahal and Bakhtiari Province

Populated places in Ben County